Centaline Property Agency Limited is one of the largest property agencies in Hong Kong. It was established in 1978 by Shih Wing-ching.

Centaline has nearly 40,000 employees and more than 2,000 offices in 39 cities in Mainland China, Hong Kong and Macao. Centaline Holdings is also the major shareholder of another property agency in Hong Kong, Ricacorp Properties Limited.

History
Centaline Property Agency Limited was founded in 1978 by Shih Wing-ching. Initially focused on the residential sector, Centaline branched out to various sectors including commercial, industrial, retail, car-parking spaces, bank-owned real estate properties and government quarters. In recent years, the company has added project management, surveying, mortgage brokerage and leasing management services. The business has also expanded to the Taipei and Singapore markets, and is gradually expanding in other Chinese-speaking areas around the world.

In November 2016, Centaline launched a cloud-based video value-added service called CentaVideo to allow the company's approximately 4,500 agents in Hong Kong to shoot video footage, edit and upload it using their mobile devices, providing residential property hunters with a home virtual tour.

External links
Centaline Holdings Company Limited

Property agencies of Hong Kong
Real estate companies established in 1978